Sherbrooke is a city in southern Quebec, Canada. It is at the confluence of the Saint-François and Magog rivers in the heart of the Estrie administrative region. Sherbrooke is also the name of a territory equivalent to a regional county municipality (TE) and census division (CD) of Quebec, coextensive with the city of Sherbrooke. With 172,950 residents at the Canada 2021 Census, it is the sixth largest city in the province and the 30th largest in Canada. The Sherbrooke Census Metropolitan Area had 227,398 inhabitants, making it the fourth largest metropolitan area in Quebec and 19th in Canada.

Sherbrooke is the primary economic, political, cultural and institutional centre of Estrie, and was known as the Queen of the Eastern Townships at the beginning of the 20th century.

There are eight institutions educating 40,000 students and employing 11,000 people, 3,700 of whom are professors, teachers and researchers. The direct economic impact of these institutions exceeds 1 billion dollars. The proportion of university students is 10.32 students per 100 inhabitants, giving Sherbrooke the largest concentration of students in Quebec.

Sherbrooke rose as a manufacturing centre in the 1800s, and today the service sector is prominent.

The Sherbrooke region is surrounded by mountains, rivers and lakes. There are several ski hills nearby and various tourist attractions in regional flavour. Mont-Bellevue Park, a large park in the city, is used for downhill skiing.

Toponymy
The city was named in 1818 for John Coape Sherbrooke, a former Governor General of Canada.

History

First Nations settled the region 8,000-3,000 years ago. The Abenaki called it Ktinékétolékouac/Kchi Nikitawtegwak (The Large Forks), or Shacewanteku (where one smokes).

The first settler was the farmer Jean-Baptiste Nolain, in 1779. The area was first surveyed in 1792. Americans from Vermont built mills in the area in 1802. Gilbert Hyatt led a group of loyalists, who settled around 1803. He dammed the Magog River and a gristmill and a sawmill were soon built nearby. The settlement was then known as Hyatt's Mills. The first immigrants from England arrived in 1815.

The British American Land Company was formed in 1832 to acquire and develop almost  of Crown land and other lands in the area. It prioritized speculation over immigration.

In 1852 a railway linked Montreal and Portland, Maine via Sherbrooke. By the 1890s there were rail connections to Boston, Halifax, and New York City.

Immigration from the rest of Quebec began in 1850, and by 1871 francophones were in the majority.

By the turn of the 20th century, Sherbrooke was a thriving industrial city, with manufacturing benefiting from locally-produced hydroelectricity. From the 1950s, some the steel and textile industries declined, giving way to government services and education.

As part of the 2000–2006 municipal reorganization in Quebec, the city grew considerably on 1 January 2002, when it absorbed Ascot, Bromptonville, Deauville, Fleurimont, Lennoxville, Rock Forest, and Saint-Élie-d'Orford. Part of Stoke was also annexed to the newly expanded Sherbrooke.

In 2012, a local Vitamin production factory suffered an explosion, which killed 2, and injured 19, some severely. A large toxic cloud enveloped part of the city, raising health concerns.

Geography

Located at the confluence of the Saint-François (St. Francis) and Magog rivers in the heart of the Eastern Townships and the  administrative region. Sherbrooke is also the name of a territory equivalent to a regional county municipality (TE) and census division (CD) of Quebec, coextensive with the city of Sherbrooke. Its geographical code is 43.

Climate
Sherbrooke has a humid continental climate (Köppen Dfb), with long, cold, and snowy winters, warm summers, and short but crisp springs and autumns. Precipitation is not sparse any time of the year, but is the greatest in summer and fall and at its least from January to April, totalling  annually.

Cityscape

Neighbourhoods
The city includes several neighbourhoods:

Le quartier universitaire
Le Vieux-Nord
Collinsville
Secteur Galvin
L'Est
Ascot
Mi-Vallon
du Pin-Solitaire
Le Petit Canada

Demographics

City of Sherbrooke 

Language 
86.4% of Sherbrooke residents spoke French as a first language in 2021, while those whose mother tongue was English accounted for 3.9%. The next most common first languages were Spanish (2%), Arabic (1.3%) and Dari (0.7%)

Ethnicity 
As of 2021, approximately 88.7% of Sherbrooke residents were white, while 9.6% were visible minorities and 1.7% were Indigenous. The largest visible minority groups in Sherbrooke were Black (3.1%), Latin American (2%), Arab (1.7%), and West Asian (1%).

Note: Totals greater than 100% due to multiple origin responses.

Sherbrooke CMA 
The Census Metropolitan Area (CMA) comprises the cities of Sherbrooke, Magog and Waterville, the municipalities of Ascot Corner, Compton, Saint-Denis-de-Brompton, Stoke and Val-Joli; the township municipalities of Hatley and Orford; and the village municipality of North Hatley. The population in 2021 was 227,398. The median age was 43.

Approximately 90.5% of the greater Sherbrooke area residents were white, while 7.7% were visible minorities and 1.8% were Aboriginal.

French was mother tongue to 87.3% of residents. The next most common mother tongues were English (4.5%), Spanish (1.6%), Arabic (1.0%) Dari (0.5%), Mandarin (0.2%), Portuguese (0.2%) and Serbian (0.2%).

About 55.7% of the population identified as Catholic in 2021 while 32.2% said they had no religious affiliation, 2.9% were Muslim, 0.5% Anglican, 0.5% Eastern Orthodox, 0.4% Jehovah's Witness and 0.4% Baptist. United Church and Pentecostals made up 0.3% of the population each while buddhist made 0.2%.

Economy

Sherbrooke, which is the economic centre of Estrie, is a significant cultural, industrial, and academic hub in the province. The city is directly served by two railways: the St. Lawrence and Atlantic Railroad and the Canadian Pacific Railway. Sherbrooke is also served by four highways as well as the regional airport named Sherbrooke Airport but located in the nearby city of Cookshire-Eaton. Sherbrooke Airport no longer offers scheduled passenger services as of March 2010.

Estrie's GDP for the same year was $.

Largest employers
As of 2010, the largest employers in Sherbrooke are Université de Sherbrooke (6,000 employees), Centre hospitalier universitaire de Sherbrooke (5,511), Commission scolaire de la Région-de-Sherbrooke (3,050), Centre de santé et de services sociaux – Institut universitaire de gériatrie de Sherbrooke (2,650), City of Sherbrooke (1,913), Desjardins Group (1,713), Cégep de Sherbrooke (800), Centre Jeunesse de l'Estrie (527), Nordia Inc. (500), Canada Post (497), Kruger Inc. - Publication papers business unit (455), Bishop's University (450) and McDonald's (400). These include enterprises operating in Sherbrooke only and having 400 or more employees.

Culture
 In the summer season, several festivals, concerts, and events are held in the city, such as the Fête du Lac des Nations, Sherblues & Folk, and the Festival des traditions du monde. Come winter, the city hosts the Carnaval de Sherbrooke.

The city has British architectural heritage, as seen in the buildings in Vieux-Nord.

Sherbrooke has the fourth largest theatre in Quebec, the Maurice O'Bready University Cultural Centre of Sherbrooke (Salle Maurice-O’bready du centre culturel de l’Université de Sherbrooke). Music, theatre, and dance shows are staged there. The Centennial Theatre of Bishop's University also hosts music and dance concerts from around the world. The Vieux Clocher, owned by the Université de Sherbrooke, has two stages, the primary being used by various music groups and comedians from around the province. The Théâtre Granada, designated as a historical site by the Canadian government, holds music concerts. It has retained its original architecture since its opening. The Petit Théâtre de Sherbrooke, located downtown, presents musicals and plays for children.

Since 2007, the Centre des arts de la scène Jean-Besré (CASJB), built by the city with the support of the Ministry of Culture and Communications, has assisted in the creation and production of material for the region's artistic community. It serves as the location for training theatre, music, and dance professionals. It contains three rehearsal studios, a production room, a decoration workshop, and a costume workshop, as well as administrative offices for each of its resident companies.

Auditoriums

Salle Maurice-O'Bready
Granada Theatre
Centennial Theatre
Vieux Clocher
Le Petit Théâtre de Sherbrooke
Théâtre Léonard Saint-Laurent
Salle Alfred-Des Rochers

Libraries
 La bibliothèque municipale Éva-Senécal, the main city library (opened 22 December 1990), is named for Éva Senécal (1905-1988), poet, novelist and journalist.
La bibliothèque du secteur de Rock Forest
La bibliothèque du secteur de Saint-Élie
La bibliothèque Gisèle-Bergeron
La bibliothèque de Lennoxville, at the intersection of rue Queen and rue College, near Bishop's University, offers a book lending service in French and English.

Attractions

Museums and visitors' centres
Sherbrooke Nature and Science Museum
Centre d'interprétation de l'histoire de Sherbrooke
Sherbrooke Museum of Fine Arts
Centre culturel et du patrimoine Uplands
Art gallery at the Centre Culturel of Sherbrooke University
Centre d'art actuel Sporobole
Prison Winter

Parks
Johnville Bog & Forest Park
Forêt jardinée de l'aéroport de Sherbrooke Sherbrooke has parks and greenspaces that encompass a variety of recreational activities. In total, there are 108 in the municipality. Parks Jacques-Cartier, Mont Bellevue, Bois Beckett, Lucien-Blanchard, Central, Quintal, Victoria, and Marais Réal-D.-Carbonneau are among the most popular destinations.
 Jacques-Cartier Park 
It contains several sports facilities including soccer fields and tennis courts. Several festivals are held here including the Fête du Lac des Nations, the Carnaval de Sherbooke, the festivities for the Fête Nationale and Canada Day.
 Mont Bellevue Park 
Situated partially on the campus of the Université de Sherbrooke, it is managed by the city and developed by volunteer organization Regroupement du Mont-Bellevue. Within the park are mounts Bellevue and John-S.-Bourque, the former of which has a small ski station. The park is also used for cross-country skiing, snowshoeing, walking, and tubing in winter; as well as hiking, mountain biking, archery, tennis, and jogging in summer.
 Bois Beckett Park
This park was established on an old maple grove that belonged to Major Henry Beckett between 1834 and 1870. The property remained in his family until it was acquired by the city in 1963. In 2000, the Ministère de Ressources naturelles et de la Faune recognized the property as an old-growth forest. The oldest tree is said to be 270 years old. The park is maintained, protected and promoted by a volunteer group. Several trails have been built by the city which are open year-round. Within the park, there are several artifacts left behind by Beckett, such as foundations, wells, and farm equipment.
 Lucien-Blanchard Park 
Bicycles, canoes, kayaks, paddle boats, and dragon boats are available for rent. There is an interpretation centre with an emphasis on the reptiles and amphibians of the region as well as a boutique.
 Central Park
At the heart of the Rock Forest–Saint-Élie–Deauville borough, this park is equipped for soccer, tennis, baseball, beach volleyball, and has a playground and an outdoor pool.
 Quintal Park
Formerly called Parc Central de Fleurimont, this park is situated in the borough of Fleurimont, and mirrors Central Park of Rock Forest-Saint-Élie-Deauville. In early July, the Pif Classic baseball tournament is held in the park, and in August, it hosts the Festival des Traditions du Monde.
 Victoria and Sylvie-Daigle Parks
Across Terrill Street from one another, these parks are situated just east of downtown. Inside these parks lie pedestrian trails, Olympic-size soccer fields, a handicap accessible outdoor pool, and a sports complex. This multifunctional facility, called the Centre MultiSport Roland-Dussault, has an artificial turf allowing local teams the opportunity to practise indoor soccer, baseball, football, rugby, and so on. There is a hockey arena.
 Marais Réal-D.-Carbonneau 
Located near the Saint-François River, this marsh was developed by CHARMES, a non-profit management corporation that seeks to promote ecotourism in and around Sherbrooke.

Sports

Baseball
The Sherbrooke Expos of the Ligue de Baseball Majeur du Québec, an amateur baseball league, play their home games at Amedée Roy Stadium.

The city also hosted some games of the 2002 World Junior Baseball Championship, and the 2013 Canada Games.

Historically, several professional teams based in Sherbrooke competed in Minor League Baseball or in independent baseball leagues:

Ice hockey
The Sherbrooke Phoenix is a junior hockey team playing in the Quebec Major Junior Hockey League.

The Sherbrooke Canadiens competed in the American Hockey League from 1984 to 1990.

Government

Sherbrooke is the seat of the judicial district of Saint-François.

Municipal
Local governance is provided by the Sherbrooke City Council. The mayor is Évelyne Beaudin.

Under the 2000–2006 municipal reorganization in Quebec, Sherbrooke merged with most of the suburban municipalities in the surrounding area: Rock Forest, Saint-Élie-d'Orford, Deauville, Fleurimont, Bromptonville, Ascot, and Lennoxville. This resulted in the creation of six Boroughs of Sherbrooke: Brompton, Fleurimont, Lennoxville, Mont-Bellevue, Rock Forest–Saint-Élie–Deauville, and Jacques-Cartier. Each of the boroughs is subdivided into electoral districts, with the number varying based on population. For example, there are only two districts in Brompton, which only has 6,314 inhabitants, whereas Fleurimont (pop. 40,824) has five. Sherbrooke has 21 districts total, for which the average population is 7,200 inhabitants.

Federal and provincial
Sherbrooke is split into the federal electoral districts of Sherbrooke, represented by Élisabeth Brière of the Liberal party of Canada and Compton—Stanstead, represented by Marie-Claude Bibeau of the Liberals.

Provincially, Sherbrooke is divided into three electoral districts. Sherbrooke is represented by Christine Labrie of the Québec solidaire (QS), Saint-François is represented by Guy Hardy of the PLQ and Richmond is represented by Karine Vallières of the PLQ.

Public safety
In 2007, the crime rate was 5,491 per 100,000.

Military

Sherbrooke does not host any units from the Regular Force with the exception of a recruiting centre, but four Primary Reserve units are stationed in the city:
52nd Field Ambulance, formerly known as 8th Medical Company.
714th Communication Squadron
Les Fusiliers de Sherbrooke
The Sherbrooke Hussars, formed from the amalgamation of The Sherbrooke Regiment and the 7th/11th Hussars in 1965.

A Canadian military artifact is preserved at the William Street Armoury, the Sherman tank "Bomb" which helped liberate Europe fighting with the Sherbrooke Fusilier Regiment and is the only Canadian tank to have landed on the Normandy beach on D-Day and fought through to VE Day without being knocked out.

Infrastructure

Transportation

Transdev Limocar provides bus service to Montreal via Granby and Magog. Formerly, Autobus Jordez linked Sherbrooke to Drummondville and Trois-Rivières, and also to Victoriaville and Quebec City, but since the company lost their licence to operate heavy vehicles, they have sold their licence to Autobus La Québécoise, who now provide the service.

Société de transport de Sherbrooke (STS) provides bus service within the city. It operates 18 bus routes, 10 minibus routes, 7 express routes, 3 taxibus routes, and 3 microbus routes.

The city is located at the eastern terminus of A-10, and directly on the Autoroute Trans-Québécoise (A-55). A-10 provides a direct freeway connection to Montreal and points west, while A-55 connects directly to Trois-Rivières, Shawinigan, and points north, as well as to Interstate 91 to the south (Vermont). A-410 and A-610 are the southern and northern bypass roads, respectively.

The last passenger train for the city was VIA Rail's Montreal – Saint John, New Brunswick Atlantic, which ended service in 1994. There have been recent proposals to provide rail service from Montreal to Boston with a stop in Sherbrooke.

Sherbrooke Airport, in Cookshire-Eaton is just east of the city. There are currently no scheduled flights operating out of the airport.

Public health
The suburban Sherbrooke University Hospital ("CHUS" or "Centre Hospitalier Universitaire de Sherbooke) has over 5,200 employees, including 550 doctors. It includes a clinical research facility, the Étienne-Lebel Research Centre.

Education

Sherbrooke has eight institutions that make up the Sherbrooke University Pole, which educates some 40,000 students and employs about 11,000 persons. University students comprise 10.32% of the population, the highest concentration in Quebec.

The city is the location of one French-language university, the Université de Sherbrooke, and an English-language university, Bishop's University. Université de Sherbrooke is a comprehensive university with schools of medicine and law and extensive graduate programs. Bishop's University is smaller and predominantly undergraduate. There are three CEGEPs in Sherbrooke, two of them French-language, the Cégep de Sherbrooke and the Séminaire de Sherbrooke, and one English-language, Champlain College Lennoxville. CCSQ and CDE College which currently enrols International Students. In the past over 100 International students have graduated and landed jobs in Sherbrooke City itself, making it an attraction to the Indian student division. There currently over 100 South Asians residing in the City of Sherbrooke which consists of Hindu, Punjabi and Gujrati ethnic background.

There are also public high school boards such as the English Eastern Townships School Board, French Commission scolaire de la Région-de-Sherbrooke and private high schools such as Séminaire de Sherbrooke founded in 1875, Bishop's College School founded in 1836, etc.

Media

See also
List of mayors of Sherbrooke
List of people from Sherbrooke
List of regional county municipalities and equivalent territories in Quebec

Notes

References

External links

 Sherbrooke website

 
Cities and towns in Quebec
Territories equivalent to a regional county municipality